The 2008 Bulgarian Figure Skating Championships was held in Sofia between January 12 and 13, 2008. Skaters competed in the disciplines of men's singles and ladies' singles on the senior level.

The results were used to choose the teams to the 2008 World Championships and the 2008 European Championships.

Guests competitors from the Czech Republic and Serbia also participated.

Results

Men

Ladies

External links
 results
 

Bulgarian Figure Skating Championships, 2008